Bia East is one of the constituencies represented in the Parliament of Ghana. It elects one Member of Parliament (MP) by the first past the post system of election. Bia East is located in the Bia East District of the Western North Region of Ghana.

Members of Parliament

References 

Parliamentary constituencies in the Western North Region